Hope Crisp and Agnes Tuckey defeated James Cecil Parke and Ethel Larcombe in the final, 3–6, 5–3 retired to win the inaugural Mixed Doubles tennis title at the 1913 Wimbledon Championships.

Draw

Finals

Top half

Section 1

Section 2

Bottom half

Section 3

Section 4

References

External links

X=Mixed Doubles
Wimbledon Championship by year – Mixed doubles